Kit Armstrong (born March 5, 1992) is an American classical pianist, composer, and former child prodigy of British-Taiwanese parentage.

Education 
Armstrong was born in Los Angeles into a non-musical family. He displayed interest in sciences, languages and mathematics. At the age of 5, and without access to a piano, he taught himself musical composition by reading an abridged encyclopedia. He subsequently began formal studies in piano with Mark Sullivan and in composition with Michael Martin (1997–2001).

Armstrong has always pursued music and academic education in parallel. He attended Garden Grove Christian School (1997–1998), Anaheim Discovery Christian School (1998–1999), Los Alamitos High School and Orange County School of the Arts (1999–2001). While in high school, he studied physics at California State University, Long Beach, and music composition at Chapman University.

At the age of 9, he became a full-time undergraduate student at Utah State University studying biology, physics, mathematics as well as music (2001–2002). In 2003, Armstrong enrolled at the Curtis Institute of Music studying piano with Eleanor Sokoloff and Claude Frank, while simultaneously taking courses in chemistry and mathematics at the University of Pennsylvania. In 2004, Armstrong moved to London to continue his music education at the Royal Academy of Music studying piano with Benjamin Kaplan, composition with Paul Patterson, Christopher Brown and Gary Carpenter, and musicianship classes with Julian Perkins. In parallel, he studied pure mathematics at the Imperial College London (2004–2008).

Armstrong received a Bachelor of Music degree with First Class Honours from the Royal Academy of Music in 2008 and a Master of Science degree with honours from Pierre-and-Marie-Curie University, Paris, in mathematics in 2012.

Armstrong has studied regularly with Alfred Brendel since 2005.

Career as pianist 
Since Armstrong's debut with the Long Beach Bach Festival Orchestra at the age of 8, he has appeared as soloist with the Leipzig Gewandhaus Orchestra, London's Philharmonia Orchestra, the NDR Symphony Orchestra in Hamburg, the Bamberger Symphoniker, the Orchestre de la Suisse Romande, the Mozarteum Orchestra of Salzburg, the Swedish Chamber Orchestra, the Gothenburg Symphony Orchestra, the Baltimore Symphony Orchestra, and Tokyo Symphony Orchestra, among others. He has collaborated with conductors including Ivor Bolton, Riccardo Chailly, Thomas Dausgaard, Christoph von Dohnányi, Manfred Honeck, Charles Mackerras, Bobby McFerrin, Kent Nagano, Jonathan Nott, and Mario Venzago. Solo piano recitals have taken Armstrong to London, Paris, Vienna, Florence, Venice, Baden-Baden, Berlin, Dortmund, Leipzig, Munich, Zurich, Geneva, Bolzano, Verbier, La Roque-d'Anthéron and various cities in the United States.

In June 2003, Armstrong was invited to play at the Carnegie Hall to celebrate the 150th anniversary of Steinway & Sons. In 2006 he won the "Kissinger Klavierolymp", a competition of young pianists related to the festival Kissinger Sommer. Among his recital projects in 2010 was a programme including etudes by Chopin and Ligeti, and J. S. Bach's Inventions and Sinfoniae. In 2011, in honour of the 200th anniversary of the birth of Franz Liszt, Armstrong played a series of recitals featuring works by Bach and Liszt, including a concert on Liszt's 1862 Bechstein piano in Nike Wagner's festival Pelerinages. Armstrong was the "artiste étoile" of the 2016 Mozart Festival Würzburg and of the Bern Symphony Orchestra.

Chamber music is one of Armstrong's central interests.

The Schleswig-Holstein Musik Festival awarded Armstrong the 2010 Leonard Bernstein Award. The  announced Kit Armstrong as WEMAG-Soloist prizewinner in 2014. Kit Armstrong was the festival's 2018 "prizewinner in residence", featuring in 24 concerts throughout the summer of 2018. Kit Armstrong was named holder of the Beethoven Ring in 2018.

In 2012, he purchased The Church of Sainte-Thérèse-de-l'Enfant-Jésus, Hirson in France as a hall for concerts and exhibitions.

Starting in March 2020, he has published every day a video from this church, sharing a piece of music together with personal and musicological explanations. This video series, "Musique, ma patrie", is the subject of profiles in French national television and press.

Career as composer 
Armstrong composes for a wide variety of ensembles in various styles and genres. His compositions include one symphony, five concertos, six quintets, seven quartets, two trios, five duos, and 21 solo pieces.

Many of his ensemble works have been performed publicly: his Symphony No. 1, Celebration was performed by the Pacific Symphony in March 2000; a string quartet commissioned by the Gewandhaus zu Leipzig in honour of Alfred Brendel's 80th birthday was premiered by the Szymanowski String Quartet in 2011; the piano trio Stop laughing, we're rehearsing! was recorded with Andrej Bielow and Brendel for GENUIN in 2012. On January 27, 2015, the Akademie für Alte Musik Berlin performed a new fortepiano concerto by Armstrong.

The percussionist Alexej Gerassimez's premiere of Armstrong's percussion concerto with Konzerthausorchester Berlin in 2017 was broadcast on German nationwide radio.

His works are published by Edition Peters.

Awards
Armstrong has received many awards for his compositions: in 1999, his Chicken Sonata was awarded the first prize by the Music Teachers' Association of California, and in 2000, Five Elements won him another first prize from the same group. In 2001, he received a $10,000 Davidson Fellows Scholarship from the Davidson Institute for Talent Development. Armstrong has received six Morton Gould Young Composer Awards from the ASCAP Foundation in New York, for Struwwelpeter: Character Pieces for viola and piano.

Works

Album- William Byrd & John Bull : The Visionaries of Piano Music (2021) 

 ut, re, mi, fa, sol, la - Fantasia (2021)
 Queen Elizabeth's Pavan (2021)
 Mephisto Waltz (2021)
 Canons 51- 48- 39-7-15- 114 (2021)
 Canons 68-78-79-65-3-53 (2021) 
 Walsingham 22 variations (2021)
 O Mistress Mine (2021) 
 other songs in album as well

Piano 
 Miniatures (2012)
 Fantasy on B–A–C–H (2011) – Commissioned by Sommerliche Musiktage Hitzacker
 Half of One, Six Dozen of the Other (2010) – Commissioned by Till Fellner
 Origami (2010)
 Lenz (2009) – Dedicated to Senator Gerhard Lenz
 Message in a Cabbage (2008) – Dedicated to Lady Jill Ritblat
 Reflections (2007)
 Variations on a Theme by Monteverdi (2007)
 Portraits, Theme and Six Variations (2006) – Dedicated to Lily Safra
 Fantasia and Toccata (2005)
 Sweet Remembrance, Suite in C Minor (2005) – Dedicated to Mrs Grosser
 A Spooky Night (2002)
 Six Short Pieces (2001)
 Transformation, Piano Sonata in G Minor (2002)
 The Triumph of a Butterfly (2001)
 Homage to Bach (2000)
 A Thunderstorm (2000)
 Chickens in the Spring Time, Theme and 46 Variations (1999)
 Five Elements (1999)
 Chicken Sonata (1998)

Solo instrumental 
 Pursuit, Five Pieces for solo marimba (2004) – Commissioned by Pius Cheung

Duo 
 Der kranke Mond for violin and cello (2012) – commissioned by Movimentos Festwochen
 Who Stole My Wasabi? for cello and piano (2008) – commissioned by Music at Plush
 Struwwelpeter, Character Pieces for violin and piano (2007)
 Struwwelpeter, Character Pieces for viola and piano (2006)
 Viola Sonata in A Minor (2005)

Trio 
 Time Flies like an Arrow for violin, cello and piano (2011) – Commissioned by the Klavier-Festival Ruhr
 Trio for violin, cello and piano (2009) – Commissioned by Music at Plush

Quartet 
 String Quartet (2011) – Commissioned by the Gewandhaus zu Leipzig for the Szymanowski Quartet in honour of Alfred Brendel's 80th birthday
 Breaking Symmetry for horn, violin, viola and cello (2008) – Commissioned by the International Chamber Music Festival The Hague
 String Quartet in D Minor (2005)
 Birds by the Pond, String Quartet in A (2004)
 Forest Scenes, String Quartet in B (2002)
 Millennium, Piano Quartet in C Minor (2000)
 String Quartet in B-flat (2000)

Quintet 
 Quintet for oboe, clarinet, horn, bassoon and piano (2009) – Commissioned by the International Chamber Music Festival The Hague
 A Play for piano quintet (2009) – Commissioned by Musikkollegium Winterthur
 Landscapes, Piano Quintet in F Minor (2006) – Commissioned by the International Chamber Music Festival The Hague
 Wind Quintet, Theme and Six Variations (2004)
 Bug Quintet, Piano Quintet in G (2003)
 A Day of Chatting and Playing, Theme and Six Variations for flute, violin, viola, cello and piano (2001)

Orchestra 
 Andante (2012) – Commissioned by Musikkollegium Winterthur
 Concerto for Clarinet and Orchestra (2010) – Commissioned by Frankfurter BachKonzerte
 Piano Concerto in F (2005)
 Anticipation, Cello Concerto in G (2003)
 Piano Concerto in D Minor (2001)
 Celebration, Symphony in F (2000)

Discography 
In September 2008, Armstrong recorded Bach, Liszt and Mozart for Plushmusic.tv.

In 2011, the film Set the Piano Stool on Fire by Mark Kidel was released on DVD, chronicling the relationship between pianist Alfred Brendel and Armstrong.

In April 2012, GENUIN released a CD by Armstrong, Brendel, and Andrej Bielow of piano trios by Haydn, Beethoven, Armstrong and Liszt.

On September 27, 2013, Sony Music Entertainment released Kit Armstrong's album "Bach, Ligeti, Armstrong". On the CD he presents his own transcriptions of 12 Chorale Preludes by J.S. Bach, his own composition and homage "Fantasy on B-A-C-H", and parts of the Musica ricercata by Ligeti.

In November 2015, Sony Music Entertainment released "Liszt: Symphonic Scenes", a solo piano CD by Armstrong.

Kit Armstrong's 2016 recital in Amsterdam Concertgebouw, featuring music by William Byrd, Jan Pieterszoon Sweelinck, John Bull, and Johann Sebastian Bach was recorded as a DVD and released by Unitel.

Concerts at the Margravial Opera House in Bayreuth in 2018 and 2019 were published on DVD, featuring music by Liszt, Mozart and Wagner.

In Byrd & Bull: The Visionaries of Piano Music, a double CD set of works by William Byrd and John Bull produced by Deutsche Grammophon in 2021, Armstrong "presents pieces that were conceived as much more than diversions for an elite or adornments to ritual, span everything from meditative elegies and rousing marches to virtuoso variations on popular melodies and Bull's ingenious canons." The publication was met with critical acclaim from BBC Music and The Times among others, in addition to the winning the year-end awards Top 10 Classical Recordings of the Year and Critics' Choice by Presto Music and Gramophone, respectively.

References

Further reading
  continued on page A15

External links 

1992 births
21st-century American male musicians
21st-century American pianists
21st-century classical pianists
Alumni of Imperial College London
Alumni of the Royal Academy of Music
American classical pianists
American male classical pianists
Chapman University alumni
Classical musicians from California
Curtis Institute of Music alumni
Living people
Musicians from Los Angeles
Orange County School of the Arts alumni
Utah State University alumni